Pick Hits Live is a live album by jazz guitarist John Scofield. It was the last of his albums to feature bass guitarist Gary Grainger and drummer Dennis Chambers.

Track listing
All tracks composed by John Scofield; except where indicated
"Pick and Pans"
"Pick Hits"
"Heaven Hill"
"Protocol"
"Blue Matter"
"Thanks Again"
"Trim" (CD only)
"Georgia On My Mind" (Hoagy Carmichael, Stuart Gorrell) (CD only)
"Make Me" (CD only)

Personnel
The John Scofield Band
John Scofield – electric guitar
Robert Aries – keyboards
Gary Grainger – bass guitar
Dennis Chambers – drums

References 

1990 live albums
John Scofield live albums
Gramavision Records live albums